Rocky Mount, in Piney Flats, Tennessee, also known as the Cobb-Massengill House, was the first territorial capital of the Southwest Territory.

The property of William Cobb, the original residence at Rocky Mount served as the territorial capital from 1790 to 1792. Dendroarchaeological investigations at the site by the University of Tennessee revealed that the present dwelling dates to the late 1820s.

The property is owned by the State of Tennessee and has been operated by the Rocky Mount Historical Association, a non-profit organization in partnership with the Tennessee Historical Commission, since 1962. The property is a living museum that recreates the year 1791, when American Founding Father William Blount was in residence as governor.  It is next to the DeVault-Massengill House.

References

External links

Rocky Mount Museum
Rocky Mount State Historic Site

History of Tennessee
Former colonial and territorial capitals in the United States
Houses in Sullivan County, Tennessee
Southwest Territory
Museums in Sullivan County, Tennessee
Living museums in Tennessee
Historic house museums in Tennessee
Tennessee State Historic Sites
Houses on the National Register of Historic Places in Tennessee
Protected areas of Sullivan County, Tennessee
National Register of Historic Places in Sullivan County, Tennessee
Homes of United States Founding Fathers